Rati Agnihotri (born 10 December 1960) is an Indian actress, known for acting in Hindi, as well as in Telugu and Tamil language films. Her roles in the cult-tragedy film Ek Duuje Ke Liye (1981) and the drama film Tawaif (1985) earned her two nominations for the Filmfare Award for Best Actress.

Early life
Agnihotri was born on 10 December 1960 in Bareilly, Uttar Pradesh, in "a conservative Punjabi family."

Film career
She began modelling at the age of ten. Agnihotri's first film roles were in the Tamil language films Puthiya Vaarpugal and Niram Maaratha Pookkal (1979).

In the 1980s, she also starred in a number of Hindi films. She received a Filmfare nomination as Best Actress for the 1981 film Ek Duuje Ke Liye, which was a Hindi remake of the Telugu film Maro Charitra from 1979. Other Hindi films from this period included Farz Aur Kanoon (1982), Coolie (1983), Tawaif (1985) which also led to her being nominated for the Filmfare award, Aap Ke Saath (1986), and Hukumat (1987).

After a 16-year absence, she returned to acting in 2001, in the Hindi film Kuch Khatti Kuch Meethi and the Tamil film Majunu. She made her Malayalam debut in Anyar (2003), English debut in An Ode to Lost Love (2003), and Bengali debut in Aaina-te (2008).

She has also acted on the stage, in plays such as Please Divorce Me Darling (2005), and television serials, such as Sixer (2005). Agnihotri spends a lot of time in Poland, where she owns an Indian restaurant with her sister Anita.

Personal life
Agnihotri married businessman and architect Anil Virwani on 9 February 1985, This, coupled with her father's death, convinced her to leave Hindi films. In 1986, the couple's son, Tanuj Virwani, was born. He is an actor working in Hindi films and television. Agnihotri and Virwani divorced in 2015.

Awards and nominations

Nominations 
1982: Filmfare Award for Best Actress – Ek Duuje Ke Liye
1986: Filmfare Award for Best Actress – Tawaif

Filmography

Film

Television

References

External links

 
 Rati Agnihotri's Profile

Living people
1960 births
People from Bareilly
Actresses from Mumbai
Punjabi people
Indian film actresses
Actresses in Hindi cinema
Actresses in Tamil cinema
Actresses in Telugu cinema
Actresses in Kannada cinema
Actresses in Malayalam cinema
Actresses in Bengali cinema
Indian television actresses
Actresses in Hindi television
20th-century Indian actresses
21st-century Indian actresses